The departments of Chad are divided into 348 sub-prefectures (sous-préfectures).

List of sub-prefectures by department and by region

 The following is a list of departments grouped by region. Shown next to each department is its population as of 2009, the name of its capital or main town (chef-lieu in French), and a list of sub-prefectures (sous-préfectures).

Bahr El Gazel 
Created in 2008 from the Kanem region's former Barh El Gazel department.

Batha

Borkou 
Created in 2008 from the Borkou-Ennedi-Tibesti region's former Borkou department.

Chari-Baguirmi

Ennedi 
Created in 2008 from the Borkou-Ennedi-Tibesti region's former Ennedi Est and Ennedi Ouest departments.

Guéra

Hadjer-Lamis

Kanem

Lac

Logone Occidental

Logone Oriental

Mandoul

Mayo-Kebbi Est

Mayo-Kebbi Ouest

Moyen-Chari

Ouaddaï

Salamat

Sila 
Created in 2008 from the Ouaddaï region's former Sila and Djourf Al Ahmar departments.

Tandjilé

Tibesti 
Created in 2008 from the Borkou-Ennedi-Tibesti region's former Tibesti department.

Wadi Fira

N'Djamena (capital) 
N'Djamena, the capital city of Chad, is also a special statute region. It has no departments, but is divided into 10 arrondissements.

See also
Regions of Chad
Departments of Chad

References 

Subdivisions of Chad
Chad 3
Chad geography-related lists